The Tomorrowverse is the name given to an American media franchise and shared universe produced by DC Entertainment and Warner Bros. Animation, and based on characters appearing in DC Comics publications. It is the successor and soft reboot of the DC Animated Movie Universe (DCAMU), with specific continuity details such as storylines being acknowledged from the prior franchise.

Jim Kreig and Kimberly S. Moreau are the producers of the franchise, which began with Superman: Man of Tomorrow (2020).

Background
The franchise is a successor to the DC Animated Movie Universe which began with Justice League: The Flashpoint Paradox in 2013 and concluded with Justice League Dark: Apokolips War in 2020. The short film Constantine: The House of Mystery (2022) acted as a coda to Justice League Dark: Apokolips War. It is named after the franchise's first film Superman: Man of Tomorrow (2020) and coined by fans sometime after the release of Justice Society: World War II (2021) and Batman: The Long Halloween (2021) due to recurring voice actors and the same animation used since Superman: Man of Tomorrow. Jim Krieg, and Kimberly S. Moreau serve as the main producers for all films. One film set in the Tomorrowverse continuity is in development, titled Justice League: Warworld.

Films

Released

Superman: Man of Tomorrow (2020) 

Kryptonian survivor Kal-El / Clark Kent (Darren Criss) is confronted by the alien bounty hunter Lobo (Ryan Hurst) while a new threat in the form of Parasite (Brett Dalton) sets its sight for Metropolis.

Justice Society: World War II (2021) 

Barry Allen / The Flash (Matt Bomer) accidentally travels to an alternate Earth while time travelling and comes into conflict with the ongoing World War 2 involving the metahuman team the Justice Society of America.

Batman: The Long Halloween (2021) 

Gotham City based vigilante Batman (Jensen Ackles) teams up with district attorney Harvey Dent (Josh Duhamel) and Gotham City Police Department Captain James Gordon (Billy Burke) to investigate a new serial killer coined "Holiday" who only kills on holidays.

Green Lantern: Beware My Power (2022) 

Marine veteran John Stewart (Aldis Hodge) is chosen to become a Green Lantern and is drawn into the middle of a Rann-Thanagar War joined by Justice League member Green Arrow (Jimmi Simpson), the Thanagarian Shayera Hol (Jamie Gray Hyder) and presumably deceased Rannian hero Adam Strange (Brian Bloom).

Legion of Super-Heroes (2023) 

Superman sends his cousin Kara Zor-El / Supergirl (Meg Donnelly) to the 31st Century where she is recruited into the Legion of Super-Heroes so that she can belong all while investigating a terrorist organisation called the Dark Circle.

Upcoming films

Justice League: Warworld 
The film was announced in July 2022 at the SDCC. The film is set to be released in July 2023

Short films

Adam Strange (2020)

Adam Strange is a direct-to-video animated short featuring the titular character searching for his daughter during the war between his people the Rannians and the Thanagarians. Charlie Weber voices Strange with the short being released on May 19, 2020 in the home media release of Justice League Dark: Apokolips War. Director Butch Lukic later confirmed in an interview that this short is connected to Green Lantern: Beware My Power despite the recasting of the character in the film.

Kamandi: The Last Boy on Earth! (2021) 
Kamandi: The Last Boy on Earth! is a direct-to-video animated short featuring the character Kamandi, who he and his friends are captured by a reincarnation of their god, the Mighty One. Cameron Monaghan voices Kamandi, with the film being released on April 27, 2021 in the home media release of Justice Society: World War II. Jeremy Adams confirmed in 2022 that the short connects with Justice Society: World War II.

Cast

Reception

See also
 DC Animated Universe
 DC Animated Movie Universe
 DC Extended Universe

References 

 
Continuity (fiction)
DC Comics franchises
Fictional universes
Film series introduced in 2020
Films based on DC Comics
DC Comics dimensions
DC Comics planets
Mythopoeia
American animated films
English-language films
Mass media franchises introduced in 2020
Warner Bros. franchises